Dynatron can refer to:

 Dynatron oscillator, type of vacuum tube electronic oscillator circuit
 Dynatron Radio Ltd, British electronics company (1927-55)
 Dynatron (music producer), Danish music producer